Ikulu is the official residence of the president of Tanzania in Dar es Salaam which was founded by Majid bin Said of Zanzibar in 1865.

The State House blends African and Arabian architecture, with wide verandahs and covered walkways. The brass-studded west doors are surmounted by a replica of the Republic's Coat of Arms and flanked by two giant drums. During 2001 one of the entrances after the car gates was adorned with two male Lions overlooking guests as they would be welcomed to the State House of The United Republic Of Tanzania.

The building contains a number of gifts from state visitors, including an Ethiopian shield with crossed spears, given by Emperor Haile Selassie and a representation of the coat-of-arms of the Republic of Tanganyika, given by the government of India in 1961, that acts as a backdrop to the President's seat in the Council Chamber.

Gallery

References

External links
 Official blog

Official residences in Tanzania
Presidential residences
Government Houses of the British Empire and Commonwealth
Buildings and structures in Dar es Salaam